Somabrachys infuscata is a species of moth in the family Somabrachyidae. It was described by Johann Christoph Friedrich Klug in 1830.

Subspecies
Somabrachys infuscata robusta Hering, 1933

References

Zygaenoidea
Moths described in 1830